DeMeo is a surname. Notable people with the surname include:

Adriana DeMeo (born 1981), American actress
Bob DeMeo (1955-2022), American musician
Roy DeMeo (1940–1983), Italian-American mobster
William DeMeo (born 1971), American actor, producer, director, and writer